Arriba, Arriba! is a Philippine sitcom and sketch comedy that aired from ABS-CBN from December 9, 2000 to August 9, 2003, replacing Oki Doki Doc and was replaced by Home Along da Airport. starring Jolina Magdangal with Camille Prats, Ai-Ai delas Alas, Heart Evangelista, Sandy Andolong, John Lapus, Rufa Mae Quinto, and Johnny Delgado. It re-aired on Jeepney TV.

Cast
Jolina Magdangal as Winona Arriba
Camille Prats as Biba Arriba
Ai-Ai delas Alas as Venus Arriba
Edgar Mortiz as Solomon Divino "Sodi" Arriba
Johnny Delgado as Yani Makalupa
Sandy Andolong as Isabel "Mamsi" Arriba
Heart Evangelista as Monina Arriba
John Lapus as Sweet
Rufa Mae Quinto as Jenny
Danilo Barrios as Tommy Gil Puyat
Bentong as Steven
Hyubs Azarcon as Atong

Episodes
"Da Wedding"

Trivia
Jolina Magdangal left the show in 2002 to move to GMA Network, leaving her home network for 10 years. Heart Evangelista replaced her as Venus' long lost daughter, Monina. Jolina finally returned to ABS-CBN in 2014.
The opening song is a parody of I Say a Little Prayer by Dionne Warwick later covered by Aretha Franklin.

See also
List of programs broadcast by ABS-CBN

External links

ABS-CBN original programming
2000 Philippine television series debuts
2003 Philippine television series endings
Philippine television sitcoms
Filipino-language television shows